Nebraska Connecting Link, Nebraska Spur, and Nebraska Recreation Road highways are a secondary part of the Nebraska highway system.  They connect small towns and state parks to the primary Nebraska highway system.  All of these highways are maintained by the Nebraska Department of Transportation.

A connecting link, or simply a link, highway connects two primary highways.  A spur highway is a highway which goes from a primary highway to a city or state park not on any other highway.  A recreation road is a road in a state park, which is designated as such by the Nebraska Game and Parks Commission, though maintained by NDOT.

Highways are generally marked in the format of S-x-Y or L-x-Y, where S or L indicates whether it is a spur or a link, x is the county the highway is in, with ranking in alphabetical order (1 is Adams County, while 93 is York County), and Y is the letter which "numbers" the highway.  Recreation Roads are typically unsigned.

History
In 1955, the Nebraska Legislature passed a law requiring all incorporated communities with a population over 100 to be included in the state highway system.  The original numbering system required placing a single digit in front of the highway number it was connecting with.  In 1971, the system was changed to the current system.

Connecting Links

Spurs

Recreation Roads

See also

References

External links
The Nebraska Highways Page:The Spur and Link Highways

 
Nebraska Connecting Link, Spur, and Recreation Highways